The Truant Soul is a 1916 American silent drama film directed by Harry Beaumont and starring Henry B. Walthall, Mary Charleson and Patrick Calhoun.

Cast
 Henry B. Walthall as Dr. John Lancaster / Dr. Lawson
 Mary Charleson as Joan Wentworth
 Patrick Calhoun as Myers
 Anna Mae Walthall as Mrs. Dana
 Mary Parkyn as Mrs. Fraser
 Ullrich Haupt as Dr. Jenkins

References

Bibliography
 Robert B. Connelly. The Silents: Silent Feature Films, 1910-36, Volume 40, Issue 2. December Press, 1998.

External links
 

1916 films
1916 drama films
1910s English-language films
American silent feature films
Silent American drama films
American black-and-white films
Films directed by Harry Beaumont
Essanay Studios films
1910s American films
English-language drama films